Wilhelm Max G. Holsboer (sometimes Holzboer; 29 July 1883 - 12 January 1958) was a Swiss ice hockey player who competed in the 1920 Summer Olympics. He later appeared in several films. In 1920, he participated with the Swiss ice hockey team in the Summer Olympics tournament.

Selected filmography
 The Call of the North (1929)

See also
List of Olympic men's ice hockey players for Switzerland

References

External links
 

1883 births
1958 deaths
HC Davos players
Ice hockey people from Geneva
Ice hockey players at the 1920 Summer Olympics
Olympic ice hockey players of Switzerland
Swiss male film actors